Logudorese Sardinian is one of the two written standards of the Sardinian language, which is often considered one of the most, if not the most conservative of all Romance languages. The orthography is based on the spoken dialects of central northern Sardinia, identified by certain attributes which are not found, or found to a lesser degree, among the Sardinian dialects centered on the other written form, Campidanese. Its ISO 639-3 code is src.

Characteristics 
Latin  and  before ,  are not palatalized in Logudorese, in stark contrast with all other Romance languages. Compare Logudorese  with Italian  , Spanish   and French  . Like the other varieties of Sardinian, most subdialects of Logudorese also underwent lenition in the intervocalic plosives of --, --, and --/ (e.g. Lat.  >  "fire",  >   "shore, bank",  >   "wheel"). Lat.  >   and  >   "leaf"). Finally, Logudorese shifts the Latin labiovelars  and  into  medially and  word-initially (Lat.  >   "tongue",  >   "what").

Logudorese is intelligible to those from the southern part of Sardinia, where Campidanese Sardinian is spoken, but it is not to those from the extreme north of the island, where Corsican–Sardinian dialects are spoken.

Sardinian is an autonomous linguistic group rather than an Italian dialect as it is often noted because of its morphological, syntactic, and lexical differences from Italian. Therefore, Italian speakers do not understand Logudorese or any other dialect of the Sardinian language.

Location and distribution
The area of Logudoro (the term originated as a blend of the kingdom's name of Logu de Torres), in which it is spoken, is a northern subregion of the island of Sardinia with close ties to Ozieri (Othieri) and Nuoro (Nùgoro) for culture and language, as well as history, with important particularities in the western area, where the most important town is Ittiri. It is an area of roughly 150 × 100 km with some 500,000–700,000 inhabitants.

Origins and features
The origins of Sardinian have been investigated by Eduardo Blasco Ferrer and others. The language derives from Latin and a pre-Latin, Paleo-Sardinian (Nuragic) substratum, but has been influenced by Catalan and Spanish due to the dominion of the Crown of Aragon and later the Spanish Empire over the island. Logudorese is the northern macro-dialect of the Sardinian language, the southern macro-dialect being Campidanese, spoken in the southern half of the island. The two dialects share a clear common origin and history, but have experienced somewhat different developments.

Though the language is typically Romance, some words are not of Latin origin, and are of uncertain etymology. One such is "nura", found in "nuraghe", the main form of pre-Roman building, hence the term for the pre-Roman era as the Nuragic Period. Various place names similarly have roots that defy analysis.

Logudorese Sardinian changed only very slowly from Vulgar Latin in comparison to other Romance lects, with Linguist Mario Pei reporting an 8% degree of separation from Latin in the Nuorese subdialect, the most conservative compared to other Romance languages. Because of this reason, as well as the preservation of many works of traditional literature from the 15th century onwards, Logudorese is often considered to be the most prestigious variety of Sardinian.

Subdialects
Logudorese Sardinian has multiple subdialects, some confined to individual villages or valleys. Though such differences can be noticeable, the dialects are mutually intelligible, and share mutual intelligibility with the neighbouring Campidanese dialects as well.

Northern Logudorese
Spoken in the north of Sardinia, this subdialect contains the following features:

  >  in an intervocalic, pre-consonantal position (Northern Saldigna vs Southern Sardigna).

Central (Common) Logudorese
Spoken in Central Sardinia, this subdialect contains the following features:

  >  in an intervocalic, pre-consonantal position (Northern altu vs Southern artu "high").

Nuorese
The Nuorese dialect is spoken in three historical regions: Baronìa, Nuorese and Barbàgia of Ollolài. The three sub-varieties are quite different from one another, and each one of them includes some distinctive features not found anywhere else in Sardinia, many of which demonstrate the conservative nature of these dialects:

No lenition of intervocalic plosives (e.g. Lat. focum > focu "fire", ripa > ripa "shore, bank", rota > rota "wheel" – Barbagian : ròda);

Lat. Sardinia > Sardinna and folium > foza "leaf");

Deletion of the initial f, except when preceded by other consonants – and in the local dialects spoken in the towns of Nuoro and Ottàna (e.g. ocu "fire", àchere "to do");

Baronìa: presence of the conjugations that end in -ta and -tu (e.g. tancàtu "closed"; achirràtu "went down"; baitàtu "watched"; muttìtu "called");

Barbàgia di Ollolài: conjugations end in -à (instead of -ada) and -u (e.g. nàu/naràu "said"; muttìu "called"); presence of glottal stops in place of the hard c (k) found in the other Nuorese dialects (e.g. inòhe "here"; ohu "fire"; àhere "to do"; hìtho "early"; vòhe "voice");

Persistence of the Latin pronouns: Lat. ego > jeo, eo, ego, dego (the latter being once used in the city of Nuoro, and with the form ego most prominently used in the towns of Olièna, Gavòi and Ollolài, less frequent but still present in the village of Mamoiàda); Lat. ipse > issu, isse (particularly in the villages of Bitti and Onanì);

Writers

A large body of Sardinian poetry, songs and literature is composed in Logudorese.

See also
 Sardinian language
 Campidanese Sardinian

References

External links

 Ditzionàriu in línia de sa limba e de sa cultura sarda
 Sardinian Grammar of Oliena's dialect
 A iscola de sardu - Sassari.tv
 Logudorese basic lexicon at the Global Lexicostatistical Database
 Sardinian basic phrases 

Logudorese dialect